The Patriotic Society Party (PSP), formerly the January 21 Patriotic Society is a populist and personalist political party in Ecuador, led by former army colonel Lucio Gutiérrez. "January 21" refers to the date of the 2000 Ecuadorian coup d'état.

At the legislative elections, 20 October 2002, the party won at least two out of one hundred seats, and additional seats in alliances with other parties. Its leader, Lucio Gutiérrez, a key figure in the 2000 coup d'état, formed an alliance with the indigenous Pachakutik Movement and won 20.3% of the vote in the presidential elections of the same day, winning the second round with 58.7%. His campaign appealed especially to indigenous citizens and lower-class voters. However, Gutiérrez was deposed in 2005, and replaced with Alfredo Palacio, an independent. Gutiérrez subsequently returned to Ecuador and was imprisoned for five months before being released. He was not allowed to participate in the 2006 election to succeed Palacio, as his political rights were suspended.

His brother, Gilmar Gutierrez, was the Society's presidential candidate in 2006. Gilmar received 17% of the vote and came in third place. However, his party won 23 seats, making it the second-largest party in the National Assembly, where no party had a majority. Defections to the government left the January 21 Patriotic Society with 19 seats.

Lucio Gutiérrez recovered his political rights in 2008 and has unsuccessfully run for president again in 2009 and 2013.

References

External links
Official web site

2002 establishments in Ecuador
Political parties established in 2002
Political parties in Ecuador
Populist parties